Tenth Avenue may refer to:

Roads
Tenth Avenue (Manhattan)
10th Avenue, Caloocan, a roadway in Caloocan, Philippines

Bridges
10th Avenue Bridge

Subway stations
 10th Avenue station (IRT Flushing Line)
10th Avenue station (PNR)

Other uses
Tenth Avenue Gang
Tenth Avenue Angel
Tenth Avenue North
360 Tenth Avenue
 Tenth Avenue (film), a 1928 American silent film

See also
10th Street (disambiguation)